Cuphodes is a genus of moths in the family Gracillariidae.

Species
Cuphodes didymosticha Turner, 1940
Cuphodes diospyri Vári, 1961
Cuphodes diospyrosella (Issiki, 1957)
Cuphodes dolichocera Vári, 1961
Cuphodes habrophanes Turner, 1940
Cuphodes holoteles (Turner, 1913)
Cuphodes lechriotoma (Turner, 1913)
Cuphodes leucocera Vári, 1961
Cuphodes lithographa (Meyrick, 1912)
Cuphodes maculosa Turner, 1940
Cuphodes melanostola (Meyrick, 1918)
Cuphodes niphadias (Turner, 1913)
Cuphodes paragrapta (Meyrick, 1915)
Cuphodes plexigrapha (Meyrick, 1916)
Cuphodes profluens (Meyrick, 1916)
Cuphodes thysanota Meyrick, 1897
Cuphodes tridora Meyrick, 1911
Cuphodes wisteriella Kuroko, 1982
Cuphodes zophopasta (Turner, 1913)

External links
Cuphodes at Global Taxonomic Database of Gracillariidae (Lepidoptera)

 
Gracillariinae
Gracillarioidea genera